Graft or grafting may refer to:

Graft (politics), a form of political corruption
Graft, Netherlands, a village in the municipality of Graft-De Rijp

Science and technology
Graft (surgery), a surgical procedure
Grafting, the joining of plant tissues
Grafting (chemistry), chemical modification of surface
Grafting (decision trees), in computer science, adding nodes to a decision tree

Art and entertainment
Graft (1915 serial), a film serial
Graft (1931 film), featuring Boris Karloff
Graft (Paine), a sculpture by Roxy Paine, National Gallery of Art Sculpture Garden, Washington, D.C.
Graft (rapper), a British rapper

Other uses
Grafting (knitting), the joining of two knitted fabrics
Graft (architects), an architecture firm

See also

Photografting, a technique used in the study of polymers
Transplant (disambiguation), including some senses meaning a type of graft

Cross-link, in some literature linking of chemicals to surface is named as grafting